In India, basketball is a popular sport, with a multiple club league system, as well as men's and women's national teams. Indian basketball made significant improvements starting from 2015 and is now one of the emerging top teams of the game with the men's team FIBA ranked 82.

History

Basketball was brought to India in 1893–4 by Canadian T. Duncan Patton, who later returned to India as the Acting General Secretary of the Calcutta YMCA from 1903–5. The game was initially most popular among women, although slow to spread. The country's first match is recorded as 1930 by some sources, with the first Indian National Championship for men being held in 1934 in New Delhi. The Basketball Federation of India (BFI), which controls the game in India, was formed in 1950.

Basketball in India today
Basketball is played in most Indian high schools, colleges and universities. There is considerable patronage for the game among the younger generation. It is played by both men and women of all ages and ability. Many government institutions have professional basketball teams who play for them. For example, ONGC in Uttarakhand, Indian Overseas Bank in Tamil Nadu, Indian Bank in Karnataka, Mahanagar Telephone Nigam Limited in New Delhi, Indian Railways, and Kerala State Electricity Board in Trivandrum play for their respective institution and state.

There are many championships for senior, junior, and youth levels for boys and girls. Invitational all-India tournaments like Master Prithvinath Memorial, Don Bosco Invitational Tournament, Kiloi Invitational Tournament, Ramu Memorial and many other are being organised every year. Indian basketball has championships throughout the year for different age groups. Championships for youth are mainly between April and July when children have their summer break from school.

Basketball is especially popular among the Tibetan exile community in Dharamshala.

Being one of the earliest countries to adopt basketball, India has so far produced numerous talented basketballers who have earned recognition in the international arena. Indian players have also won several trophies for their country. Basketball in India is mainly being run and managed by a large number of national and state level associations, spread all over India. These basketball associations are working with a common view of popularising the game in all parts of the country. Apart from that, developing the overall infrastructure for the game and uncovering new talent from the grassroots level are some of the other principal objectives of the Indian basketball associations.

India's first ever professional basketball league UBA was started in 2015. UBA completed four seasons in India.

Basketball Federation of India
The Basketball Federation of India was established in 1950 and is the official governing body of basketball in India. It follows FIBA rules for organising basketball championships and is affiliated to FIBA Asia and the Indian Olympic Association.

National teams

Senior

Men's senior
 India men's national basketball team
 India men's national 3x3 team

Women's senior
 India women's national basketball team
 India women's national 3x3 team

Age group

Boys
 India men's national under-16 basketball team
 India men's national under-17 basketball team
 India men's national under-18 basketball team

Girls
 India women's national under-16 basketball team
 India women's national under-17 basketball team
 India women's national under-18 basketball team

League system
India created its first professional basketball league, titled Universal Basketball Alliance (UBA), in 2015. The first winner of the UBA was Chennai Slam. The tournament was folded in 2017 after it completed its fourth season and in 2022 the league was replaced with the Elite Pro Basketball League.

The National Basketball Championship is national level basketball tournament for both men and women, organised by the Basketball Federation of India, the governing body of basketball in India. The competition is contested among the regional state teams affiliated under the Federation.

3x3 Pro Basketball League (also known as 3BL India) is a men's and women's professional 3x3 basketball league in India recognised by FIBA and the Basketball Federation of India.

List of major basketball tournaments in India
5x5 format
 UBA (until 2017)
 Elite Pro Basketball League (EPBL)
 INBL
 Elite Women's Pro Basketball League
 National Basketball Championship (men's, women's)
 Indian School Basketball League/Indian College Basketball League)
3x3 format
 3BL
 INBL

International support and influence

NBA in India
The National Basketball Association has realised the immense potential of the sport in this large and growing market, and is working hard with the Basketball Federation of India to expand its popularity.

2008
Late in 2008, NBA great Robert Parish came to India as part of the NBA/WNBA Hoop School Program. This relationship further expanded into a cultural exchange, which saw Bollywood superstars Lara Dutta and Dino Morea make a trip to watch the Los Angeles Lakers in action, and on 8 April, 2009, saw the NBA inaugurate a refurbished basketball court in a Mumbai suburb.

2015
In April 2015, Canadian Sim Bhullar made his professional debut in the NBA, becoming the first player of Indian descent in the league. Two months later, Satnam Singh Bhamara became the first Indian to ever be selected in the NBA by being the 52nd pick in the 2015 NBA draft for the Dallas Mavericks. He'd also been the first player to be drafted as a high school postgraduate since 2005.

2017
In April 2017, India on track (IOT) collaborated with NBA to form NBA Basketball Schools to train kids and teach them to play the NBA way. There are more than 12 centres running around the country from Delhi, Mumbai, Pune, and many more.

2019
The first ever NBA games in India took place on 4 and 5 October 2019 at the NSCI Dome in Mumbai. The NBA India Games 2019 featured two preseason games between the Sacramento Kings and Indiana Pacers, and marked the first time that teams from a North American sports league played in India.

IMG Reliance joint venture
In June 2010, a deal was struck with the BFI and the IMG-Reliance joint venture which aims to take Indian basketball to a professional level. The 30-year deal sees IMG Reliance take control of the game launching a league, controlling merchandise, developing infrastructure and other commercial aspects in this new development. The BFI will launch and control school and college leagues with assistance from IMG. IMG Reliance will also construct academies in India in line with the IMG Florida sports academy. In July, coaches from Florida came to India to select 8 boys and girls between the ages of 13-15 to take to the US on a scholarship. The first batch was selected and is preparing to undertake the scholarship at IMG Florida. More scholarships will be offered with the aim of launching India's first professional league in four years. IMG chief Ted Fortsmann and Reliance owner Mukesh Ambani see the IPL as a perfect model to use. Therefore, a franchise system is likely to be put into place.

At the moment, the NBA are not involved with the joint venture but Ted Fortsmann is willing to work with the NBA who already run recreational leagues in India with another leading Indian business, the Mahindra Group. These are set in expand from the initial three cities to other parts of India.

One of the first people to have been accepted to the IMG Reliance program, Satnam Singh Bhamara, had also declared to go for the 2015 NBA Draft while coming straight out of the IMG Reliance program as a post-graduate. When Bhamara was selected by the Dallas Mavericks as the 52nd pick of the draft, he would be the first player to have been drafted directly out of high school without any additional international, college, or D-League competition since Amir Johnson back in 2005.

See also
India national basketball team
India women's national basketball team
Sport in India

References

External links
Official Website
Asia-basket.com
Basketball in India by JD Walsh
Robert Parish launches Hoop School in India
NBA Launches a court in India
American basketball coach to train Indian hoopsters
The story about Indian basketball improvements